A non-metropolitan county, or colloquially, shire county, is a county-level entity in England that is not a metropolitan county. The counties typically have populations of 300,000 to 1.8 million. The term shire county is, however, an unofficial usage. Many of the non-metropolitan counties bear historic names and most, such as Wiltshire and Staffordshire, end in the suffix "-shire". Of the remainder, some counties had the "-shire" ending but have lost it over time, such as Devon and Somerset.

Origins
Prior to 1974 local government had been divided between single-tier county boroughs (the largest towns and cities) and two-tier administrative counties which were subdivided into municipal boroughs and urban and rural districts. The Local Government Act 1972, which came into effect on 1 April 1974, divided England outside Greater London and the six largest conurbations into thirty-nine non-metropolitan counties. Each county was divided into anywhere between two and fourteen non-metropolitan districts. There was a uniform two-tier system of local government with county councils dealing with "wide-area" services such as education, fire services and the police, and district councils exercising more local powers over areas such as planning, housing and refuse collection.

As originally constituted, the non-metropolitan counties were largely based on existing counties, although they did include a number of innovations. Some counties were based on areas surrounding large county boroughs or were formed by the mergers of smaller counties. Examples of the first category are Avon (based on Bath and Bristol) and Cleveland (based on Teesside). An example of the second category is Cumbria, formed by the merger between Cumberland and Westmorland. The counties were adopted for all statutory purposes: a lord-lieutenant and high sheriff was appointed to each county, and they were also used for judicial administration, and definition of police force areas. The Royal Mail adopted the counties for postal purposes in most areas.

Changes

1995–1998
A Local Government Commission was appointed in 1992 to review the administrative structure of the non-metropolitan counties. It was anticipated that a system of unitary authorities would entirely replace the two-tier system. The Commission faced competing claims from former county boroughs wishing to regain unitary status and advocates for the restoration of such small counties as Herefordshire and Rutland. The review led to the introduction of unitary local government in some areas but not in others. In the majority of unitary authorities an existing district council took over powers from the county council. The 1972 Act required that all areas outside Greater London form part of a non-metropolitan county, and that all such counties should contain at least one district. Accordingly, the statutory instruments that effected the reorganisation separated the unitary districts from the county in which they were situated and constituted them as counties. The orders also provided that the provisions of the 1972 Act that every county should have a county council should not apply in the new counties, with the district council exercising the powers of the county council.

An exception was made in the case of Berkshire, which was retained with its existing boundaries in spite of the abolition of its county council and the creation of six unitary authorities. This was done in order to preserve its status as a royal county.

With the creation of numerous new non-metropolitan counties, the areas used for lieutenancy and shrievalty began to diverge from local government areas. This led to the development of ceremonial counties for these purposes, a fact recognised by the Lieutenancies Act 1997.

2009
A further wave of unitary authorities were created in 2009 under the terms of the Local Government and Public Involvement in Health Act 2007. While a number of new counties were created, several of the new authorities (such as Cornwall or Northumberland) continued to have the boundaries set in 1974.

2019–2023
The 2019–2023 structural changes to local government in England have involved or will involve changes to the non-metropolitan county of Dorset (2019), and the abolition of the non-metropolitan counties Northamptonshire (2021) and Cumbria (2023). In addition, the non-metropolitan counties of Buckinghamshire (2020), North Yorkshire (2023), and Somerset (2023) are or will be unchanged, but their councils will become unitary authorities as the existing non-metropolitan districts in these areas were or will be consolidated and the district councils abolished.

List of non-metropolitan counties
The following list shows the original thirty-nine counties formed in 1974, subsequent changes in the 1990s, and further changes since then.
 Current
 Planned abolition
 abolished non-metropolitan county
 abolished non-metropolitan county and associated ceremonial county

Wales
In Wales there was not a distinction between metropolitan and non-metropolitan counties, with all upper tier areas designated "counties". The Local Government (Wales) Act 1994 amended the 1972 Act, abolishing the Welsh counties and creating instead new Welsh principal areas, some of which are also designated "counties". For the purposes of lieutenancy the counties constituted in 1974 were preserved.

See also
 ISO 3166-2:GB, subdivision codes for the United Kingdom
 Political make-up of local councils in the United Kingdom#County councils

References

External links
 Map of the UK counties and unitary administrations
 Map of all UK local authorities

 
Interested parties in planning in England
Local government in England
1974 establishments in England